General elections were held in Lesotho on 7 October 2022 to elect all 120 members of the National Assembly, the lower house of the Parliament of Lesotho.

Background 
The previous general elections in 2017 were called after prime minister Pakalitha Mosisili lost a vote of no confidence. In the election, the All Basotho Convention (ABC), led by Tom Thabane, won 48 seats. The Democratic Congress (DC) led by Mosisili won 30 seats, the Lesotho Congress for Democracy party (LCD) secured 11 seats whilst numerous minor parties won 27. The ABC won three additional seats; however, the results of those constituencies were declared null and void due to the deaths of some candidates contesting those seats. Following the election, the ABC announced its intention to form coalition government with the Reformed Congress of Lesotho, the Alliance of Democrats and the Basotho National Party. The new government was sworn in on 16 June and Thabane assumed office as prime minister.

Thabane's estranged wife, Lipolelo, was murdered shortly before his inauguration. In 2020, Thabane began to face pressure to step down due to his alleged role in Lipolelo's murder. The coalition government subsequently collapsed after ABC's alliance partners withdrew their support. Thabane resigned from the premiership in May, and finance minister Moeketsi Majoro succeeded him. The ABC then formed another government with the Basotho National Party. Thabane later resigned as leader of the ABC, and in February 2022, the party elected Nkaku Kabi to succeed him.

Majoro did not contest the ABC primaries, while several ABC ministers lost their nominations.

Electoral system 
The 120 members of the National Assembly are elected using the mixed-member proportional representation system, with voters casting two votes. Eighty members are elected from single-member constituencies by first-past-the-post voting, with the remaining 40 elected from a single nationwide constituency as leveling seats, which are allocated to make seat totals reflect the national vote share. Any party winning more seats in the single-member constituencies than their national vote share entitles them to will not be awarded more seats.

Conduct 
Polling stations opened at 07:00. Delegations from the African Union, the Southern African Development Community, the Commonwealth of Nations and the European Union were present to observe the elections.

Voting concluded at 17:00. Whilst there were no reports of significant upheavals to the electoral process, polling stations turned away several individuals whose names were not present on the electoral roll. Independent Electoral Commission (IEC) director, Mpaiphele Maqutu, said turnout was higher than in previous elections. However, the IEC did acknowledge that participation in some rural regions was low, with a lighter voter presence in places such as Thaba-Tseka.

Opinion polls

Results 
The elections were postponed in the Stadium Area constituency following the death of the Basotholand Total Liberation Congress candidate.

The ruling All Basotho Convention lost all its constituency seats, including that of party leader Nkaku Kabi. Although the Democratic Congress party ran its campaign opposing the ABC, the party's recent support for the coalition government allowed the new Revolution for Prosperity (RFP) party to seem more credible as a new start.

Aftermath 
On 11 October, Revolution for Prosperity leader Sam Matekane announced that his party had reached a coalition agreement with the Alliance of Democrats and the Movement for Economic Change. Matekane will lead the government as Prime Minister.

PM Majoro submitted his formal resignation to the King on 14 October; the King accepted, and asked Majoro to remain until the new PM was inaugurated. This occurred on 28 October after the new parliament was sworn in.

References 

Lesotho
General election
Elections in Lesotho
Lesotho
Election and referendum articles with incomplete results